Ali Hamed Al-Awasa (born 17 July 1957) is a Jordanian sport shooter. He competed in the 1984 Summer Olympics.

References

1957 births
Living people
Shooters at the 1984 Summer Olympics
Jordanian male sport shooters
Olympic shooters of Jordan